Crimes of the Past, also known as The Spy and the Sparrow, is a 2009 thriller film starring David Rasche, Elisabeth Röhm, and Eric Roberts.

Plot
Retired CIA Agent Thomas Sparrow (David Rasche) retires and returns home to Seattle to try to reconnect with his long-lost daughter (Elisabeth Röhm), but a former colleague (Eric Roberts) complicates things by coming back into Sparrow's life.

Cast
 David Rasche as Thomas Sparrow
 Elisabeth Röhm as Josephine Sparrow
 Eric Roberts as Robert Byrne
 Chad Lindberg as Kidd Bangs
 John Aylward as Clay Covington
 Cynthia Geary as Agent Cotton
 Olivia Thomas as Erin Baker
 Charles Leggett as Salesman

Production
Filming took place in Seattle, Washington from  February 16 - March 14, 2007, and opened up to mixed to reviews. Stephen Farber of the Hollywood Reporter said "While it lacks major marquee names and doesn't quite hit a home run, it is an engrossing, superbly acted movie that will please audiences who manage to catch it."

Distribution
The film was acquired for distribution by MarVista Entertainment, and premiered on Lifetime Movie Network February 12, 2011.

External links
 
 
 Crimes of the Past review from The Hollywood Reporter

2009 films
Films shot in Washington (state)
Films shot in Seattle
Films set in Seattle
2000s English-language films
2009 thriller films
American thriller films
2000s American films